John Arthur Douglas Bloomfield, 2nd Baron Bloomfield  (12 November 1802 – 17 August 1879) was a British peer and diplomatist.

Background
Bloomfield was the eldest son of Benjamin Bloomfield, 1st Baron Bloomfield and his wife Hariott, the oldest daughter of Thomas Douglas, of Grantham.

Career 
From 1824, Bloomfield was attaché at Lisbon and was transferred as secretary of legation to Stuttgart in the following year. He was sent to Stockholm in 1826 and came as secretary of embassy to St Petersburg in 1839. Five years later, he was promoted to envoy. In 1846, he succeeded his father as baron and in 1848, he was awarded a Companion of the Order of the Bath (CB).

Bloomfield was appointed ambassador to Berlin in 1851 and on this occasion was advanced to a Knight Commander (KCB). In 1858, he was further honoured as a Knight Grand Cross (GCB). He reached his highest post as ambassador to Vienna in 1860 and was sworn of the Privy Council. . He represented Britain at many official functions, helped organize international conferences, and gathered information on Austria-Hungary, Prussia and nearby smaller nations, sending daily reports to London. He supported the British policy of noninvolvement and saw the Emperor as essential to the balance of power and stability in continental Europe. On his retirement in 1871, he was created Baron Bloomfield, of Ciamaltha in the County of Tipperary, this time in the Peerage of the United Kingdom, which entitled him to a seat in the House of Lords. He represented County Tipperary as a Deputy Lieutenant.

Marriage and family
On 4 September 1845, Bloomfield had married Georgiana Liddell, the 16th and youngest child of Thomas Liddell, 1st Baron Ravensworth and a former maid of honour to Queen Victoria. The couple had no children. Lord Bloomfield had an extramarital daughter named Thecla born in 1833 by Swedish actress Emilie Högquist, and a son Albert whose birthdate is unknown. Albert was not mentioned after Emilie Högquist came under the protection of King Oscar I of Sweden.

Death
John Arthur Douglas, Lord Bloomfield died without legitimate heir in 1879 at his home, Ciamhaltha, near Newport, County Tipperary and his titles became extinct. Bloomfield was buried in his family's vault at Borrisnafarney parish Church, beside the Loughton Demense and Moneygall, in County Offaly. An impressive memorial exists in the church in his memory.

Bloomfield Mausoleum 
The Borrisnafarney Parish Church in the Bloomfield Mausoleum, located 1.5 miles from the village of Moneygall beside the Loughton Estate in County Offaly, Ireland.

 "The interior name plaques, that commemorate those who lie there, ensure that history will not forget them: they read 'Thomas Ryder Pepper 1828; Mrs Bloomfield 1828; Mrs Ryder Pepper 1841; Lieutenant General Benjamin Baron Bloomfield 1846;"

Arms

References

1802 births
1879 deaths
Ambassadors of the United Kingdom to Austria-Hungary
Ambassadors of the United Kingdom to Russia
Barons in the Peerage of Ireland
Barons in the Peerage of the United Kingdom
Deputy Lieutenants of Tipperary
Diplomatic peers
Eldest sons of British hereditary barons
Knights Grand Cross of the Order of the Bath
Members of the Privy Council of the United Kingdom
Non-interventionism
Pages of Honour
Peers of the United Kingdom created by Queen Victoria